Na Kho Ruea is a tambon (subdistrict) of Hot District, in Chiang Mai Province, Thailand. In 2019 it had a total population of 4,792 people.

History
The subdistrict was created effective August 27, 1976 by splitting off 6 administrative villages from Ban Aen.

Administration

Central administration
The tambon is subdivided into 10 administrative villages (muban).

Local administration
The whole area of the subdistrict is covered by the subdistrict administrative organization (SAO) Na Kho Ruea (องค์การบริหารส่วนตำบลนาคอเรือ).

References

External links
Thaitambon.com on Na Kho Ruea

Tambon of Chiang Mai province
Populated places in Chiang Mai province